"I Wouldn't Know" is a song recorded by Swedish singer Benjamin Ingrosso. The song was released in Sweden on 27 July 2018 as the second single from Ingrosso's debut studio album, Identification. "I Wouldn't Know" peaked at number 30 on the Swedish Singles Chart.

Music video
A music video to accompany the release of "I Wouldn't Know" was directed by Robin Nadir and released on 26 August 2018.

Track listing

Charts

Certifications

Release history

References

2018 singles
2018 songs
English-language Swedish songs
Benjamin Ingrosso songs
Swedish pop songs
Songs written by Benjamin Ingrosso